William Bradford (1845-1919) was a prolific architect of breweries. Born in 1845 in Devon, son of Robert Bradford 1818-1875 (a builder). Responsible for building or altering 70 breweries his first commission was a small addition to the "Hope Brewery" in East Grinstead (1879). Died at home in Surbiton on 2 February 1919.

He married Hannah Laura Barrat (1848-1893) on 23 April 1872 in St Pancras, London England.

William Bradford (1845-1919) worked in the brewing industry from the late 1860s and established his architectural practice at 40 King William Street, London EC4, in 1879, moving to Carlton Chambers, 12 Regent Street, London W1, in early 1882. Bradford's works included building or altering over 70 breweries and maltings throughout the country, although the majority were in the south of England. His practice concentrated almost entirely on breweries, maltings and ancillary buildings, notably tower breweries, eventually arriving at a distinctive decorative style, featuring ironwork and a picturesque roof line, that is easily identifiable today. The practice was known as William Bradford & Sons by 1905. The firm continued under his sons, W.Stovin-Bradford and J. W. Bradford, and designed several lavishly ornamented public houses and was last heard of in 1946.

W.Stovin-Bradford presented a paper on the architecture of breweries at the White Horse Hotel, Congreave Street, Birmingham on 21 January 1932.  Born in 1877 he died during the war in 1940. One of his sons was Frank Stovin-Bradford

William Bradford was the architect of an unexecuted new brewery which was proposed for a site in Ashbourne Road, Limerick, in 1895 and of another on a site next to the railway station in Dundalk, Co. Louth, for the Great Northern Brewery Co. in 1896. The brewery in Limerick was abandoned for economic reasons after objections by the local Redemptorists. It is unclear if William Bradford was the architect of the Great Northern Brewery in Dundalk which was built in 1896. A contemporary picture of the brewery appears to match the style of other breweries.

Breweries and buildings that he is responsible for are:
 Hope Brewery East Grinsted (1879)
Salters of Rickmansworth around 1888
 Erection a new 40-quarter plant, as well as enlargement of the existing premises
The Bottle House for Camden Brewery (1900-1901) Grade II Listed Hawley Crescent Camden London
Prince of Wales Brewery, Nottingham (1891) Grade II Listed Alpine Street, Basford, Nottingham
Swan Brewery, Fulham (1882)
Shipstones Star Brewery, New Basford 1901       Shipstones Brewery 
Castle Brewery, Newark 1889-90 Grade II Listed Albert Street, Newark
Mansfield Brewery 1907 Demolished 2008
Cheltenham Brewery 1898 
 Tower still remains. Henrietta Street, Cheltenham
Hook Norton Brewery 1899
 Hook Norton, Oxfordshire
Wells Brewery, Watford 1902
The Unicorn Brewery Ipswich
Tolly Cobbold Brewery Ipswich (1896) Grade II listed 
Albion Brewery
 Only Grade II listed brewery engineers house stands 27a Mile End Rd, London
Harveys Bridge Wharf Brewery 1882 Lewes Harveys Brewery
Courage Alton Brewery Hampshire
Lamb Brewery Chiswick (1901)
Hanson Brewery 1890 Hanson's Brewery was completed, adjacent to the Hardy's site, with a 6-storey brewery tower as its centrepiece.
 McMullen's Old Brewery (1891)
 George Ware Brewery Frant (1893)
 Offilers Brewery Derby (1884)
 Camerons Brewery Lion Brewery, Hartlepool addition of a new maltings in 1883
 Teignworthy Brewery Ltd, The Maltings
 Tucker's Maltings, Newton Abbot, Devon (1900)
 McArthur's Warehouse maltings, Gasferry Road, Bristol (1897)
 H Luker 25-quarter Brewery, Southend (1891)
 Hartleys Brewery, West Cowick 1892  (Brewers Journal 1892)
 Wooldridge & Co Tottenham Brewery (1892)
 Magee Marshall & Co Brewery, Bolton 1893 (Brewers Journal)
 Canon Brewery Clerkenwell 1894
 Millwall Working Mens Club (1900) 
 Royal Brewery Brentford 1899 Alteration and additions (BJ 1899 p215)
 Phipps Bridge Street Brewery, Northampton. extension 1905

References

Architects from Devon
1845 births
1919 deaths